Athelstan is a former city in Taylor County, Iowa, United States, along the Platte River, on the border with Missouri; it is majority owned by the Young family. The population was 18 at the 2000 census.  As of the 2010 census, it is recognized as a census-designated place with a population of 19.

History
Athelstan got its start following construction of the Chicago Great Western Railroad through the territory.

In 2004, after years of rural flight, the tiny city was disincorporated, ending its status as an officially recognized community.

Geography
Athelstan is on the border of Missouri.

Athelstan's longitude and latitude coordinates in decimal form are 40.572664, -94.542476.

Demographics

As of the census of 2000, there were 18 people, 13 households, and 2 families residing in the city. The racial makeup of the city was 100.00% White.

There were 13 households, out of which none had children under the age of 18 living with them, 15.4% were married couples living together, and 84.6% were non-families. 61.5% of all households were made up of individuals, and 23.1% had someone living alone who was 65 years of age or older. The average household size was 1.38 and the average family size was 2.00.

In the city the population was spread out, with 5.6% from 18 to 24, 22.2% from 25 to 44, 16.7% from 45 to 64, and 55.6% who were 65 years of age or older. The median age was 68 years. For every 100 females, there were 200.0 males. For every 100 females age 18 and over, there were 200.0 males.

The median income for a household in the city was $23,750, and the median income for a family was $25,625. Males had a median income of $24,688 versus $0 for females. The per capita income for the city was $13,737. There were no families and 31.6% of the population living below the poverty line, including no under eighteens and 50.0% of those over 64.

See also
Other discontinued cities in Iowa:
 Donnan
 Green Island
 Hurstville
 Kent
 Littleport
 Moneta
 Oneida
 Plain View

References

Former populated places in Iowa
Census-designated places in Taylor County, Iowa
Census-designated places in Iowa
Populated places disestablished in 2004